The  W.J. Buck Polygonal  Barn was a historical structure located near Diagonal in rural Ringgold County, Iowa, United States. It was built in 1907 and was listed on the National Register of Historic Places (NRHP) in 1986. The building measured  around. The structure of the barn was basically a central octagon with a sectioned roof. Double pitch sheds surrounded the barn characterizing it as an encircling wing type. The central section was six-sided and the wing was nine-sided. The plan appears to be the same as the one for the Lloyd Z. Jones stock barn published in Wallaces' Farmer on January 16, 1903, and again on October 25, 1907, and June 17, 1910. It has subsequently been torn down. It was removed from the NRHP in 2022.

References

National Register of Historic Places in Ringgold County, Iowa
Barns on the National Register of Historic Places in Iowa
Buildings and structures completed in 1907
Buildings and structures in Ringgold County, Iowa
Polygonal barns in the United States
Former National Register of Historic Places in Iowa